Christmas Vol. II is the second Christmas album of country music band Alabama. It was released on September 17, 1996.

Track listing
"The Blessings" (Teddy Gentry, Randy Owen, Ronnie Rogers, Greg Fowler) - 4:35
"Christmas in Your Arms" (Bill Anderson, Steve Wariner) - 3:23
"Christmas Is Love" (Rich Alves, T. J. Knight, Jerry Taylor) - 3:24
"When It Comes to Christmas" (Gentry, Owen, Rogers) - 2:51
"I Was Young Once Too" (Richard Leigh, Robert Byrne) - 3:32
"The Night Before Christmas" (Jim McBride, Sam Hogin, Nelson Larkin) - 4:13
"O Little Town of Bethlehem" (Lewis Redner) (Public Domain) - 3:11
"Happy Birthday Jesus" (J. P. Pennington, Gentry) - 3:08
"The Christmas Spirit" (Gentry, Owen, Rogers) - 4:12
"Hangin' 'Round the Mistletoe" (Kostas) - 2:19
"The Little Drummer Boy" (Katherine Kennicott Davis, Henry Onorati, Harry Simeone) - 4:40
"Rockin' Around the Christmas Tree" (Johnny Marks) - 2:21
"New Year's Eve 1999" (Gretchen Peters) - 2:45

Personnel 

Alabama
 Jeff Cook – guitars, fiddle, backing vocals
 Randy Owen – guitars, lead vocals
 Teddy Gentry – bass guitar, backing vocals
 Mark Herndon – drums

Additional Musicians

 John Mattick – acoustic piano,  organ, synthesizers
 Steve Nathan – keyboards
 Larry Hanson – keyboards, guitars
 Tim Briggs – guitars, mandolin, harmonica
 Dann Huff – electric guitars
 Biff Watson – acoustic guitars
 Emory Gordy Jr. – bass guitar, string arrangements 
 Lonnie Wilson – drums 
 Terry McMillan – percussion, harmonica
 Jim Nelson – saxophone
 Glen Duncan – fiddle
 Anthony LaMarchina – cello
 Bruce Christenson – viola
 Jim Grosjean – viola
 Kathryn Plummer – viola
 Kristin Wilkinson – viola
 David Davidson – violin
 Connie Heard – violin
 Pamela Sixfin – violin
 Christian Teal – violin
 Bob Moffatt – backing vocals (3)
 Clint Moffatt – backing vocals (3)
 Dave Moffatt – backing vocals (3)
 Scott Moffatt – backing vocals (3)
 The Jeffettes – backing vocals (6)

Production

 Alabama – producers
 Emory Gordy Jr. – producer 
 Russ Martin – track recording, overdub recording (1-5, 7-13)
 Tim Dobson – overdub recording (6)
 Ed Turner – overdub recording (6)
 Chris Davie – track recording assistant 
 Tim Waters – overdub recording assistant (1-5, 7-13)
 Stephen Tillisch – mixing 
 Brian Hardin – mix assistant 
 Glenn Meadows – mastering 
 Susan Eaddy – art direction 
 Gina Binkley and Altar Ego – design

Chart performance
Album

Singles

Certifications

References

1996 Christmas albums
Christmas albums by American artists
Country Christmas albums
Alabama (American band) albums
RCA Records Christmas albums